Native Canadians is the second album by the band Fiasco.

The album was originally recorded by record producer Billy Pavone, but on June 17, 2005, the band announced on their Myspace page that they would not be using his recordings, but would instead use new recordings that they made themselves. The band toured in celebration of release of the CD in August, but because the vinyl pressing was not complete, the album was not released until two months after the initial tour on October 12, 2008 at a CD release party. The CD was not released to the public until October 14.

Track listing 
All songs were written by Fiasco.

Vinyl Version

Side A 
 "Steve Herman" - 3:28
 "Oh, You Horny Monster!" - 2:24
 "It's Like Fishing Without a Hook and Expecting to Catch Fish" - 3:20

Side B 
 "You Can Walk the Walk, But Can You Drive the Car?" - 2:43
 "I Figure It's Better We Do Something Ridiculous Than Nothing at All" - 6:06
 "I Wanna Be Your Cat" - 3:38

CD Version 
 "Steve Herman" - 3:28
 "Oh, You Horny Monster!" - 2:24
 "It's Like Fishing Without a Hook and Expecting to Catch Fish" - 3:20
 "You Can Walk the Walk, But Can You Drive the Car?" - 2:43
 "I Figure It's Better We Do Something Ridiculous Than Nothing at All" - 6:06
 "I Wanna Be Your Cat" - 3:38

Personnel 
 Jonathan Edelstein - Guitar
 Julian Bennett Holmes - drums
 Lucian Buscemi - Bass

References 

2008 albums
Fiasco (band) albums